Callum Barker (born 28 July 1997) is an Australian motorcycle racer. 2013, he participated for the first time in a Moto3 World Championship event, as a wild-card rider in the Australian round at Phillip Island but failed to qualify for the race.  Barker has competed for most of his career in the Australia.

Career statistics

Grand Prix motorcycle racing

By season

Races by year

References

External links
 http://www.motogp.com/en/riders/Callum+Barker
 http://www.gpupdate.net/en/motogp-riders/2081/callum-barker/

Living people
1997 births
Australian motorcycle racers
Moto3 World Championship riders